This article documents the statistics of the 2015 Rugby World Cup which took place in England from 18 September to 31 October.

Team statistics
The following table shows the team's results in major statistical categories.

Source: ESPNscrum.com

Try scorers
8 tries

 Julian Savea

6 tries

 Nehe Milner-Skudder

5 tries

 Juan Imhoff
 Bryan Habana
 JP Pietersen
 Gareth Davies

4 tries

 Adam Ashley-Cooper
 Drew Mitchell
 D. T. H. van der Merwe
 Tommy Seymour

3 tries

 Santiago Cordero
 Tevita Kuridrani
 David Pocock
 Nick Easter
 Jack Nowell
 Anthony Watson
 Keith Earls
 Rob Kearney
 Beauden Barrett
 Mark Bennett
 Francois Louw
 Cory Allen

2 tries

 Tomás Cubelli
 Julián Montoya
 Matías Moroni
 Joaquín Tuculet
 Bernard Foley
 Ben McCalman
 Sean McMahon
 Mike Brown
 Nemani Nadolo
 Wesley Fofana
 Sofiane Guitoune
 Rabah Slimani
 Mamuka Gorgodze
 Tommy Bowe
 Amanaki Lelei Mafi
 Jacques Burger
 Johann Tromp
 Sam Cane
 Malakai Fekitoa
 Jerome Kaino
 Tawera Kerr-Barlow
 Ma'a Nonu
 Kieran Read
 Ben Smith
 Adrian Apostol
 Mihai Macovei
 John Hardie
 Bismarck du Plessis
 Schalk Burger
 Jack Ram
 Telusa Veainu
 Chris Wyles

1 try

 Horacio Agulla
 Matías Alemanno
 Juan Martín Hernández
 Facundo Isa
 Martín Landajo
 Tomás Lavanini
 Lucas Noguera Paz
 Juan Pablo Orlandi
 Guido Petti
 Nicolás Sánchez
 Leonardo Senatore
 Matt Giteau
 Michael Hooper
 Sekope Kepu
 Dean Mumm
 Rob Simmons
 Henry Speight
 Joe Tomane
 Matt To'omua
 Aaron Carpenter
 Matt Evans
 Jeff Hassler
 Jonny May
 Henry Slade
 Billy Vunipola
 Tevita Cavubati
 Vereniki Goneva
 Nemia Kenatale
 Kini Murimurivalu
 Leone Nakarawa
 Ben Volavola
 Gaël Fickou
 Rémy Grosso
 Guilhem Guirado
 Nicolas Mas
 Yannick Nyanga
 Pascal Papé
 Louis Picamoles
 Lasha Malaghuradze
 Giorgi Tkhilaishvili
 Beka Tsiklauri
 Seán Cronin
 Luke Fitzgerald
 Iain Henderson
 Chris Henry
 David Kearney
 Jordi Murphy
 Conor Murray
 Seán O'Brien
 Jared Payne
 Johnny Sexton
 Tommaso Allan
 Gonzalo Garcia
 Edoardo Gori
 Michele Rizzo
 Leonardo Sarto
 Giovanbattista Venditti
 Alessandro Zanni
 Yoshikazu Fujita
 Ayumu Goromaru
 Karne Hesketh
 Michael Leitch
 Kotaro Matsushima
 Akihito Yamada
 Johan Deysel
 JC Greyling
 Eugene Jantjies
 Theuns Kotzé
 Dane Coles
 Waisake Naholo
 Brodie Retallick
 Aaron Smith
 Codie Taylor
 Victor Vito
 Sonny Bill Williams
 Tony Woodcock
 Valentin Popîrlan
 Ovidiu Tonița
 Valentin Ursache
 Rey Lee-Lo
 Manu Leiataua
 Motu Matu'u
 Tim Nanai-Williams
 Tusi Pisi
 Paul Perez
 Ofisa Treviranus
 Peter Horne
 Greig Laidlaw
 Sean Maitland
 WP Nel
 Finn Russell
 Matt Scott
 Tim Visser
 Duncan Weir
 Schalk Brits
 Damian de Allende
 Lood de Jager
 Fourie du Preez
 Eben Etzebeth
 Jesse Kriel
 Lwazi Mvovo
 Adriaan Strauss
 Latiume Fosita
 Kurt Morath
 Soane Tonga'uiha
 Fetu'u Vainikolo
 Chris Baumann
 Titi Lamositele
 Takudzwa Ngwenya
 Carlos Arboleya
 Agustín Ormaechea
 Hallam Amos
 Scott Baldwin
 Samson Lee
 Justin Tipuric

Conversion scorers
23 conversions

 Dan Carter

13 conversions

 Nicolás Sánchez
 Greig Laidlaw

12 conversions

 Bernard Foley

10 conversions

 Ian Madigan

9 conversions

 Handré Pollard

8 conversions

 Owen Farrell

7 conversions

 Nemani Nadolo
 Ayumu Goromaru
 Rhys Priestland

6 conversions

 Frédéric Michalak
 Tommaso Allan
 Theuns Kotzé

5 conversions

 Quade Cooper
 Morgan Parra
 Florin Vlaicu

4 conversions

 Santiago González Iglesias
 Juan Pablo Socino
 Nathan Hirayama
 Merab Kvirikashvili
 Johnny Sexton
 Beauden Barrett
 Dan Biggar

3 conversions

 Pat Lambie
 Morné Steyn

2 conversions

 Marcelo Bosch
 George Ford
 Rory Kockott
 Vunga Lilo
 AJ MacGinty

1 conversion

 Ben Volavola
 Lasha Malaghuradze
 Colin Slade
 Patrick Fa'apale
 Tusi Pisi
 Finn Russell
 Kurt Morath
 Agustín Ormaechea

Penalty goal scorers
23 penalties

 Handré Pollard

20 penalties

 Nicolás Sánchez

16 penalties

 Bernard Foley
 Greig Laidlaw

15 penalties

 Dan Biggar

13 penalties

 Ayumu Goromaru
 Dan Carter

9 penalties

 Tommaso Allan

8 penalties

 Owen Farrell

7 penalties

 Frédéric Michalak
 Tusi Pisi
 Kurt Morath
 AJ MacGinty

6 penalties

 Ian Madigan
 Johnny Sexton
 Theuns Kotzé

5 penalties

 Merab Kvirikashvili
 Felipe Berchesi

4 penalties

 Nathan Hirayama
 Scott Spedding
 Florin Vlaicu

3 penalties

 Nemani Nadolo
 Ben Volavola
 Morgan Parra
 Michael Stanley

2 penalties

 George Ford
 Pat Lambie

1 penalty

 Santiago González Iglesias
 Gordon McRorie
 Lasha Malaghuradze
 Beauden Barrett
 Valentin Calafeteanu
 Stuart Hogg
 Finn Russell
 Duncan Weir
 Vunga Lilo
 Alejo Durán

Drop goal scorers
2 drop goals

 Dan Carter
 Nicolás Sánchez
 Handré Pollard

1 drop goal

 Owen Farrell
 Dan Biggar

Point scorers

Kicking accuracy

Scoring

Overall
 Total number of points scored: 2439
 Average points per match: 50.81
 Total number of tries scored: 271 (including 6 penalty tries)
 Average tries per match: 5.65
 Total number of braces: 26
 Total number of hat-tricks: 8
 Total number of conversions missed: 77
 Total number of conversions scored: 194
 Conversion success rate: 71.59%
 Total number of penalty goals missed: 64
 Total number of penalty goals scored: 227
 Penalty goal success rate: 78.01%
 Total number of drop goals scored: 8
 Total number of penalty tries awarded: 6

Timing
 First try of the tournament: Penalty try for England against Fiji
 First brace of the tournament: Mike Brown for England against Fiji
 First hat-trick of the tournament: Cory Allen for Wales against Uruguay
 Last try of the tournament: Beauden Barrett for New Zealand against Australia
 Last brace of the tournament: Drew Mitchell for Australia against Scotland
 Last hat-trick of the tournament: Adam Ashley-Cooper for Australia against Argentina
 Fastest try in a match from kickoff: 2nd minute (1:08), Rob Simmons for Australia against Argentina
 Latest try in a match: 80+4th minute (83:55), Karne Hesketh for Japan against South Africa

Teams
 Most points scored by a team in the pool stage: 179 by Argentina
 Fewest points scored by a team in the pool stage: 30 by Uruguay
 Most points conceded by a team in the pool stage: 226 by Uruguay
 Fewest points conceded by a team in the pool stage: 35 by Australia and Ireland
 Most points scored by a team in the knockout stage: 116 by New Zealand
 Fewest points scored by a team in the knockout stage: 13 by France
 Most points conceded by a team in the knockout stage: 84 by Australia
 Fewest points conceded by a team in the knockout stage: 23 by Wales
 Most points scored by a team: 290 by New Zealand
 Best point difference: +176 by New Zealand
 Worst point difference: −196 by Uruguay
 Most points scored in a match by both teams: 83 points, Argentina 64–19 Namibia
 Most points scored in a match by one team: 65 by Australia
 Most points scored in a match by the losing team: 34 by Scotland
 Biggest margin of victory: 64 by South Africa
 Most tries scored by a team in the pool stage: 25 by New Zealand
 Most tries scored by a team in the knockout stage: 14 by New Zealand
 Fewest tries scored by a team: 2 by Uruguay
 Most tries scored in a match: 12 tries, Argentina (9) vs Namibia (3)
 Most tries scored in a match by one team: 11 by Australia
 Most wins achieved by a team: 7 by New Zealand
 Fewest wins achieved by a team: 0 by
 Canada
 Namibia
 United States
 Uruguay
 Most losses achieved by a team: 4 by
 Canada
 Namibia
 United States
 Uruguay
 Fewest losses achieved by a team: 0 by New Zealand
 Most consecutive wins achieved by a team: 7 by New Zealand
 Most consecutive losses achieved by a team: 4 by
 Canada
 Namibia
 United States
 Uruguay
 Most pool points: 19 by New Zealand
 Fewest pool points: 0 by United States and Uruguay
 Most bonus points: 4 by South Africa
 Fewest bonus points: 0 by Georgia, Japan, Romania, United States and Uruguay
 Largest ranking difference win by a lower ranked team: 10 places – Japan (13th) vs South Africa (3rd)
 Largest ranking difference win by a higher ranked team: 19 places – New Zealand (1st) vs Namibia (20th)

Individual
 Most points scored by an individual: 97 - Nicolás Sánchez (Argentina)
 Most tries scored by an individual: 8 – Julian Savea (New Zealand)
 Most conversions scored by an individual: 23 – Dan Carter (New Zealand)
 Most penalty goals scored by an individual: 23 – Handré Pollard (South Africa)
 Most drop goals scored by an individual: 2 –
Daniel Carter (New Zealand)
Handré Pollard (South Africa)
Nicolás Sánchez (Argentina)
 Most tackles made by an individual: 77 –
 Lood de Jager (South Africa)
 Francois Louw (South Africa)
 Most lineouts won by an individual: 57 – Dane Coles (New Zealand)
 Most lineouts stolen by an individual: 6 –
 Brodie Retallick (New Zealand)
 Kieran Read (New Zealand)
 Most clean breaks made by an individual: 15 – Nehe Milner-Skudder (New Zealand)
 Most offloads made by an individual: 13 – Sonny Bill Williams (New Zealand)
 Most metres made by an individual: 561 – Nehe Milner-Skudder (New Zealand)
 Most carries made by an individual: 96 – Schalk Burger (South Africa)
 Most carries over gain line made by an individual: 38 – Schalk Burger (South Africa)
 Most turnovers won by an individual: 17 – David Pocock (Australia)
 Most points scored by one player in a match: 28 – Bernard Foley for Australia vs England
 Most tries scored by one player in a match: 3
Cory Allen for Wales vs Uruguay
Adam Ashley-Cooper for Australia vs Argentina
Nick Easter for England vs Uruguay
Bryan Habana for South Africa vs United States
Jack Nowell for England vs Uruguay
JP Pietersen for South Africa vs Samoa
Julian Savea for New Zealand vs Georgia and vs France
 Most conversions scored by one player in a match: 7
Dan Carter for New Zealand vs France
Rhys Priestland for Wales vs Uruguay
 Most penalty goals scored by one player in a match: 7 – Dan Biggar for Wales vs England
 Most drop goals scored by one player in a match: 1
Dan Biggar for Wales vs South Africa
Dan Carter for New Zealand vs South Africa and vs Australia
Owen Farrell for England vs Wales
Handré Pollard for South Africa vs Scotland and vs Wales
Nicolás Sánchez for Argentina vs Georgia and vs South Africa
 Highest kicking accuracy by an individual: 100%
Valentin Calafeteanu (Romania)
Alejo Durán (Uruguay)
Patrick Fa'apale (Samoa)
Rory Kockott (France)
Colin Slade (New Zealand)
Juan Pablo Socino (Argentina)
Duncan Weir (Scotland)
 Highest kicking accuracy by an individual (minimum 10 attempts): 92% - Theuns Kotzé for Namibia
 Lowest kicking accuracy by an individual: 0%
Carlo Canna (Italy)
Matt Giteau (Australia)
Niku Kruger (United States)
Folau Niua (United States)
Johnny Redelinghuys (Namibia)
 Lowest kicking accuracy by an individual (minimum 10 attempts): 45% - Quade Cooper for Australia
 Oldest scorer: Nick Easter for England vs Uruguay (37 years, 56 days)
 Youngest scorer: Titi Lamositele for United States vs Scotland (20 years, 228 days)

Hat-tricks
Unless otherwise noted, players in this list scored a hat-trick of tries.

Man of the match awards

Discipline

Yellow cards
2 yellow cards

 Campese Ma'afu (vs Australia & vs Uruguay)
 Agustín Ormaechea (both vs Fiji)

1 yellow card

 Marcelo Bosch (vs Namibia)
 Tomás Cubelli (vs South Africa)
 Ramiro Herrera (vs Ireland)
 Pablo Matera (vs New Zealand)
 Tomás Lavanini (vs Australia)
 Quade Cooper (vs Uruguay)
 Will Genia (vs Wales)
 Tevita Kuridrani (vs Fiji)
 Dean Mumm (vs Wales)
 Owen Farrell (vs Australia)
 Jamie Cudmore (vs Ireland)
 Nanyak Dala (vs France)
 Jebb Sinclair (vs Romania)
 Nikola Matawalu (vs England)
 Louis Picamoles (vs New Zealand)
 Mamuka Gorgodze (vs Argentina)
 Jaba Bregvadze (vs Namibia)
 Merab Kvirikashvili (vs Tonga)
 Paul O'Connell (vs Canada)
 Peter O'Mahony (vs Italy)
 Kotaro Matsushima (vs Scotland)
 Renaldo Bothma (vs Georgia)
 Aranos Coetzee (vs Georgia)
 Tinus du Plessis (vs Argentina)
 Jaco Engels (vs New Zealand)
 JC Greyling (vs Argentina)
 Raoul Larson (vs Georgia)
 Jerome Kaino (vs South Africa)
 Richie McCaw (vs Argentina)
 Kieran Read (vs Tonga)
 Ben Smith (vs Australia)
 Conrad Smith (vs Argentina)
 Cătălin Fercu (vs Canada)
 Csaba Gál (vs Ireland)
 Ion Paulică (vs France)
 Johan van Heerden (vs Italy)
 Faifili Levave (vs Japan)
 Filo Paulo (vs Japan)
 Sakaria Taulafo (vs Japan)
 Greig Laidlaw (vs South Africa)
 Sean Maitland (vs Australia)
 Ryan Wilson (vs Samoa)
 Jannie du Plessis (vs Scotland)
 Bryan Habana (vs New Zealand)
 Coenie Oosthuizen (vs Japan)
 Paul Ngauamo (vs New Zealand)
 Alex Cuthbert (vs Australia)
 Eric Fry (vs Japan)
 Santiago Vilaseca (vs England)

Red cards
1 red card

 Agustín Ormaechea (vs Fiji)

Penalty tries
2 penalty tries

Awarded against , vs 

1 penalty try

Awarded against , vs 
Awarded against , vs 
Awarded against , vs 
Awarded against , vs

Citing/bans
For the 2015 Rugby World Cup, Citing Commissioner Warnings carry the same weight as a yellow card.

Stadiums

Attendances

 89,267 – Ireland vs Romania, Wembley Stadium
 89,019 – New Zealand vs Argentina, Wembley Stadium
 81,129 – England vs Wales, Twickenham Stadium
 81,010 – England vs Australia, Twickenham Stadium
 80,863 – Australia vs Wales, Twickenham Stadium
 80,125 – New Zealand vs Australia, Twickenham Stadium
 80,090 – New Zealand vs South Africa, Twickenham Stadium
 80,025 – Argentina vs Australia, Twickenham Stadium
 80,015 – England vs Fiji, Twickenham Stadium
 79,572 – South Africa vs Wales, Twickenham Stadium
 77,110 – Australia vs Scotland, Twickenham Stadium
 76,232 – France vs Italy, Twickenham Stadium
 72,163 – Ireland vs Argentina, Millennium Stadium
 72,163 – France vs Ireland, Millennium Stadium
 71,887 – Wales vs Uruguay, Millennium Stadium
 71,887 – New Zealand vs France, Millennium Stadium
 71,576 – Wales vs Fiji, Millennium Stadium
 69,187 – New Zealand vs Georgia, Millennium Stadium
 68,523 – Ireland vs Canada, Millennium Stadium
 67,253 – Australia vs Fiji, Millennium Stadium

 Lowest attendance: 10,103 – Tonga vs Namibia, Sandy Park

See also
 2019 Rugby World Cup statistics
 Records and statistics of the Rugby World Cup
 List of Rugby World Cup hat-tricks
 List of Rugby World Cup red cards

External links
Rugby World Cup Stats 
Disciplinary Decisions
Rugby World Cup 2015 Tournament statistics

References

Statistics
Rugby union records and statistics